Joann Garcia Camacho is a Guamanian businesswoman and former First Lady of Guam from 2003 to 2011.

Early life 
Camacho was born in Guam. Camacho's parents are Jesse and Amparo Garcia. Camacho has three brothers. In 1974, Camacho graduated from Academy of Our Lady of Guam.

Education 
In 1978, Camacho earned a Bachelor's degree in finance from University of San Francisco.

Career 
On November 5, 2002, when Felix Perez Camacho won the election as the Governor of Guam, Camacho became the First Lady of Guam. Camacho served as First Lady of Guam on January 6, 2003, until January 3, 2011.

Camacho became a General Manager for the Guam Visitor's Bureau, until December 2012. Nathan Denight served as Acting General Manager until a successor is named. Camacho became a director of market development for Duty Free Shoppers (DFS) Guam.

Awards 
 2015 Businesswoman of the Year. Sponsored by First Hawaiian Bank and Guam Business Magazine. Presented at the 10th Annual Businesswoman of the Year Gala. September 6, 2015.

Personal life 
Camacho's husband is Felix Perez Camacho, former Governor of Guam. They have three children.

References

External links 
 Joann at postguam.com

First Ladies and Gentlemen of Guam
Guamanian businesspeople
Guamanian Republicans
Guamanian women in politics
University of San Francisco alumni
Year of birth missing (living people)
Living people
21st-century American women